Landsberg (Lech) station is a railway station in the municipality of Landsberg am Lech, in Bavaria, Germany. It is located at the junction of the Bobingen–Landsberg am Lech and Landsberg am Lech–Schongau lines of Deutsche Bahn.

Services
 the following services stop at Landsberg (Lech):

References

External links
 
 Landsberg (Lech) layout 
 

Railway stations in Bavaria
Buildings and structures in Landsberg (district)